Pivara Tuzla or Tuzla brewery, is a Bosnian brewing company founded in 1884, based in Tuzla, Bosnia and Herzegovina.
It is the third oldest brewery in Bosnia and Herzegovina.

History

Pivara Tuzla was founded in 1884 under the name Erste Dampf Brauarei (The first steam brewery) Dolnja Tuzla, by Tasing and Köhn, who brought a Czech pilsner beer brewing technique.
With the arrival of the Austro-Hungarian rule to the Tuzla area, industrial capacities were expanded.

Tuzla Brewery also owns a line of supplementary product programs installed at the end of the nineties, which is used for the production of soft drinks and mineral water.

Brands

Tuzlanski pilsner (pilsner)
Erster beer (lager)
Crno Premium beer (dark beer)
Radler Premium beer (radler)
Tuzlanski kiseljak (mineral water)
Panonska Ledena (soft drink)
Laganese (juice)
Fenix (energy drink)

References

External links
 Pivara Tuzla web site
 Pivara Tuzla at the Sarajevo Stock Exchange

Beer in Bosnia and Herzegovina
Tuzla
Food and drink companies established in 1884
Brands of Bosnia and Herzegovina
1884 establishments in Bosnia and Herzegovina